Les Beaux Messieurs de Bois-Doré is an 1857 French historical novel by George Sand.

History 
The work was first published as a serial in Le Progrès Illustré in 1857, then was revived in volume by A. Cadot in 1858.

The novel tells a series of romantic and adventurous adventures in the context of religious oppositions during the reign of Louis XIII.

Adaptations 
 Theatre
The work was adapted to the stage by Sand and Paul Meurice. The premiere took place on 26 April 1862 at the Théâtre de l'Ambigu-Comique.

 On television
 1976: The Gallant Lords of Bois-Doré, French miniseries directed by Bernard Borderie, with Georges Marchal,  and 

Novels by George Sand
1857 French novels
French-language novels
French novels adapted into plays
Novels first published in serial form
Television shows based on French novels